Birendra was crowned as the tenth King of Nepal on 24 February, 1975., at the age of 29. The coronation was held two years after the death of his father, King Mahendra because the first year was a year of mourning period and the next was considered inauspicious by the astrologers.  Representatives from 60 nations attended the ceremony.

Ceremony
The coronation was held in Hanuman Dhoka at Kathmandu Durbar Square. All the buildings and temples on main roads were whitewashed and restored. All the hippies and foreign tourists were taken out of the Durbar Square.

The coronation was done following hindu rituals as King is considered as a form of God Vishnu. Several key rituals were administered by priest privately to the King and Queen only. 

In a day before coronation a ritual, called Purvanga was performed at Hanuman Dhoka. Birendra sat on a cloth mat in  the courtyard. The ritual involved offering rice, barley and wheat to gods and ancestors while a group of Hindu priests chanted Vinayaka. Then the priests called for ancestral blessings by praying to the planets including Jupiter and Mars. During the prayer, queen Aishwarya sad beside the King.

The next day, a parade of military units, musical bands and bagpipes followed by a six horsed carriage, a gift from Queen Elizabeth, carried the royal couple to Hanuman Dhoka. There, the King was smeared with mud from a dozen locations such as hills, rivers, farms and temples symbolizing that the new king is aware of his land. Then he ritually bathed with cow milk, yogurt, butter and honey. After cleaning, the king moved to sit in the golden throne while the priest chanted sacred Vedic mantras. The king bowed to the royal priest (Raj Guru). The Raj Guru then placed the royal crown on the head of Birendra at the auspicious moment of 8:37 am determined by the court astrologers. The king vowed “I shall tend to the growth of the country, regarding it as God himself. I shall remain alert and active for the sake of my country. I shall be my peoples’ beloved, like the raindrops.” in Sanskrit. cannon salvos were fired to indicate the ceremony had been conducted. Later in the day, king rode an elephant named Prem Prasad draped in velvet cloth, gold and silver and visited temples and places near the palace. Another 22 elephants followed the king carrying the guests. Citizens lined in road to see the king. Crown Prince Deependra was wearing military uniform.

Notable guests
The guest included representatives from 60 nations.  Some of them were:
 Philip W. Buchen, counsel of US President Ford. 
 Senator Charles H. Percy of lillinois 
 Carol C. Laise, assistant Secretary of State for Public Affairs
 Prince Charles and Earl Mountbattan from Britain
 Crown Prince Akhito from Japan
 Sir John Kerr, the Governor General of Australia
 William Gopallawa, the Presidents of Sri Lanka
 Fazal Elahi Chaudry, the president of Pakistan
 Gopal Swarup Pathak, the vice president of India
 Prince of Wales
 Ferdinand E. Marcos, wife of the Philippine president
 Duke and Duchess of Gloucester
 Lord Mountbattan
 Prince Henrik of Denmark
 Crown Prince Vong Savang of Laos

Significances
 The attendance of Indian vice president instead of Indian President was seen as a move against the protest in Nepal when India took over the kingdom of Sikkim.

References

External links
Photographs and videos

Nepalese monarchs